Gaia is a music group started initially as an alias of Armin van Buuren, which is known for the songs like "Tuvan", "Stellar" and "Empire of Hearts". The current members of Gaia are Armin van Buuren and Benno de Goeij, hence when a Gaia set is performed live, Armin and Benno both take the stage together. Armin has a running joke where he refers to Gaia as 'his friends' in order to not associate himself with the project.

The first studio album of Gaia was released on June 21, 2019.

Discography

Studio albums

Releases

References

Dutch dance music groups